Pampa Wind Farm may refer to:

 Pampa Wind Project, a cancelled wind project in Texas
 Pampa Wind Farm (Uruguay), a 141.6 MW wind project in Uruguay scheduled for 2016